is a sub-kilometer asteroid and synchronous binary system, classified as near-Earth object and potentially hazardous asteroid of the Apollo group. It was discovered on 31 January 2008, by the LINEAR program at Lincoln Laboratory's Experimental Test Site near Socorro, New Mexico, United States. The eccentric asteroid measures approximately 600 meters in diameter and has a composition of a basaltic achondrite.

In 2008, its minor-planet moon, designated , was discovered by radar astronomers. It measures approximately 200 meters in diameter, or one third of its primary.

Orbit and classification 

 orbits the Sun at a distance of 0.9–3.5 AU once every 3 years and 4 months (1,209 days). Its orbit has an eccentricity of 0.59 and an inclination of 8° with respect to the ecliptic. Published by the Digitized Sky Survey, a first precovery was taken at Palomar Observatory in 1955, extending the asteroid's observation arc by 53 years prior to its discovery.

On 14 July 2008, it transited Earth within 0.015 AU (5.9 LD).

Physical characteristics 

 has been characterized as a V-type asteroid by astronomers using the SpeX spectrograph at NASA Infrared Telescope Facility, IRTF.

Rotation period 

The lightcurve gave a rotation period of  hours with a brightness variation of 0.04 in magnitude.

Binary system 

On 6 and 7 July 2008, research conducted using the Arecibo Observatory produced evidence that  is a synchronous binary asteroid with a minor-planet moon in its orbit. The secondary component, provisionally designated , has a diameter of at least 200 meters, about 33% the size of and up to 1.5 kilometers apart from its primary. The Collaborative Asteroid Lightcurve Link assumes a standard albedo for stony asteroids of 0.20 and calculates a diameter of 650 meters, based on an absolute magnitude of 18.3.

There are more than 60 binary near-Earth objects known to exist (2016).

Mineralogy 

On 26 July 2008, observations at the IRTF using the SpeX-spectrograph showed that  is a basaltic achondrite, suggesting that its parent body was subjected to sufficiently high temperatures to  produce a eutectic melt. The body's surface is thought to be dominated by iron-rich orthopyroxenes with little or no olivine.

Naming 

As of 2017, this minor planet remains unnamed.

Notes

References

External links 
 Asteroids with Satellites, Robert Johnston, johnstonsarchive.net
 Binary and Ternary Near-Earth Asteroids Detected by Radar, Lance Benner at echo.jpl.nasa.gov
 Asteroid Lightcurve Database (LCDB), query form (info )
 Dictionary of Minor Planet Names, Google books
 Asteroids and comets rotation curves, CdR – Observatoire de Genève, Raoul Behrend
 
 
 

450894
450894
450894
450894
450894
450894
20080131